Johannes Bleive (17 September 1909 Tartu – 16 May 1991 Tartu) was an Estonian composer.

In late 1920s and 1930s, he studied at Tartu Higher Music School. In 1939, he graduated from Tallinn Conservatory.

1940–1985, he was a music theory pedagogue in Heino Eller Tartu Music School.

Works
 sonate "1. Piano Sonate" (1937)
 cantate "Ränduri laulud" (1939)
 cycle of piano "Mereetüüdid" (1963)
 cycle of songs "Sügisesed puud" (1963)
 piece for orchestra "Neoontulede mäng" (1973)
 oratorium "Sajanditest läbi" (1971)

References

1909 births
1991 deaths
Estonian composers